Scott Drinkwater (born 15 May 1997) is an Australian professional rugby league footballer who plays as a  and  for the North Queensland Cowboys in the NRL. 

He previously played for the Melbourne Storm in the National Rugby League.

Early life
Drinkwater was born in Penrith, New South Wales, Australia and was raised on the Central Coast, New South Wales. He is of German and Indigenous Australian descent

He played his junior rugby league for the Terrigal Sharks. While attending Terrigal High School, he represented the 2015 Australian Schoolboys.

Playing career

Early career
In 2015, Drinkwater played for the Central Coast Centurions in the SG Ball Cup. Later that year, he represented the Australian Schoolboys and signed a three-year deal with the Melbourne Storm.

In 2016, Drinkwater joined Melbourne's NYC team, where he played 29 games over two seasons, scoring 23 tries. In 2017, he moved up to the Storm's Queensland Cup feeder side, the Sunshine Coast Falcons, where he started at five-eighth in their Grand Final loss to the PNG Hunters.

2018
In 2018, Drinkwater played the majority of the season for the Melbourne club's Queensland Cup feeder side, the Easts Tigers. On 24 June, he started at fullback for the Queensland Residents in their 20–36 loss to New South Wales Residents.

In Round 25 of the 2018 NRL season, he made his NRL debut for Melbourne against Penrith, scoring a try in the 16–22 loss. 

On 29 August, he was named at fullback in the Intrust Super Cup Team of the Year.

2019
On 2 March, Drinkwater tore his pectoral muscle in Melbourne's pre-season trial match against the North Queensland Cowboys, returning 13 weeks later in the Easts Tigers 40–22 win over the Northern Pride. 

On 24 June, he was released by the Melbourne Storm and signed immediately with the North Queensland Cowboys, on a -year contract.  Before his departure to North Queensland, Drinkwater was described as the next Billy Slater and was nominated as the player to take the vacant fullback jersey at Melbourne. In Round 15 of the 2019 NRL season, he made his debut for North Queensland, scoring a try in their 14–22 loss to the St. George Illawarra Dragons.

2020
In February, Drinkwater was a member of North Queensland's 2020 NRL Nines winning squad. He was named the Player of the Tournament and was named in the Team of the Tournament.

He started the season as North Queendland's starting , scoring tries in Round 2 and Round 6. In the Cowboys' Round 9 loss to the Sydney Roosters, he ruptured his MCL and missed four weeks.

2021
On 5 May, Drinkwater re-signed with the North Queensland Cowboys until the end of the 2023 season.

2022
In round 20 of the 2022 NRL season, Drinkwater scored two tries for North Queensland in a 34-8 victory over St. George Illawarra.  The following week, he scored a further two tries in North Queensland's victory over Canterbury.
Drinkwater played 22 games for North Queensland throughout the year as North Queensland finished third on the table and qualified for the finals.  Drinkwater played in both finals matches including their upset loss to Parramatta in the preliminary final which denied North Queensland a fairy tale Grand Final appearance.

2023
In round 2 of the 2023 NRL season, Drinkwater was sent to the sin bin during North Queensland's 28-16 loss against arch-rivals Brisbane after hitting Corey Oates with a shoulder charge which broke the players jaw. Drinkwater was later suspended for three matches.

Achievements and accolades

Individual
NRL Nines Player of the Tournament: 2020
Queensland Cup Team of the Year: 2018
Cooper Cronk Feeder Club Player of the Year: 2018

Team
2020 NRL Nines: North Queensland Cowboys – Winners

Statistics

NRL
 Statistics are correct to the end of the 2021 season

Personal life
Drinkwater's older brother, Josh, is also a professional rugby league footballer, who plays for the Catalans Dragons in the Super League. He is best mates with Terrigal Sharks second grade coach Dane Clarke.

References

External links

North Queensland Cowboys profile

1997 births
Living people
Australian people of German descent
Australian rugby league players
Eastern Suburbs Tigers players
Melbourne Storm players
Rugby league fullbacks
Sunshine Coast Falcons players
Rugby league five-eighths
Rugby league players from Penrith, New South Wales
Indigenous Australian rugby league players
North Queensland Cowboys players
Wiradjuri people